Post-Zionism refers to the opinions of some Israelis,  diaspora Jews and others, particularly in academia, that Zionism fulfilled its ideological mission with the formation of the modern State of Israel in 1948, and that Zionist ideology should therefore be considered at an end.  Right-wing Jews also use the term to refer to the  left wing of Israeli politics in light of the Oslo Accords of 1993 and 1995.

Some critics associate post-Zionism with anti-Zionism; proponents strenuously deny this association.

Characteristic of the perceptions of post-Zionism
Post-Zionism is a term associated with a variety of perceptions and different positions, behind which stands criticism of the core beliefs of Zionist groups. Post-Zionists raise many questions about Zionism and the state of Israel, among them:
 Is the State of Israel indeed a safe shelter for the Jewish nation? Are there any other places in the world in which the Jews' conditions are better from a historical point of view? (For example, Jews in the United States)
 Is it possible for Israel to be a Jewish and democratic state? In situations where being a Jewish state and a democracy are in conflict with each other, which is more important? Should Israel become a state of all its citizens?
 Is the Israeli–Palestinian conflict entirely black-and-white? Did Israel always maximize its efforts to obtain peace? Should all the blame for the continuation of the conflict fall on the Arab side?

Many of the aforementioned questions have also been raised by Zionists. However, the post-Zionists emphasize these points in their conception of Zionist history.

In sociological development
Transformations that took place in Israeli society in the 1980s and 1990s brought considerable changes to its values and political views. These changes have taken place in the economic field—e.g., liberalization of the Israeli economy and its opening to the global market, as well as in the breaking of the cultural hegemony of the labor movement, which existed up to that time. The prominent turning point occurred in 1977, when the right-wing Likud party first won parliamentary majority. This alone was a manifestation of the strengthening of the more extreme Zionist positions.

Several changes occurred in this period in tandem, including a reaction to the strengthening of the Zionist component in the government. Still, not all of the numerous changes occurring in tandem are due to one factor, and they are not all attributable to the phenomenon called post-Zionism.

The transformations in Israeli society accompanying the phenomenon of post-Zionism are found in a number of fields:

Economic characteristics Just as there are no economic characteristics unique to Zionism, which encompasses the full range of economical ideologies from Marxism, Communism, and Syndicalism to Capitalism, there are no economic characteristics unique to post-Zionism, which encompasses extreme left-wing components as well as components that maintain a capitalist ideology. The capitalist political view of the free market and the nurturing of individualism was acceptable to great parts of the Zionist movement in Israel and outside Israel, and it is not only attributable to the post-Zionist movement. Even in the strongly socialist Histadrut during the Yishuv, there existed a non-socialist liberal party. Post-Zionist parties that retain capitalist objectives and political views have continued to undermine the socialist political views that typified the Labor Party agenda, which had a central place in the Zionist movement. The loss of the institutional collective and its historical foundations can be seen in the writings of a considerable part of the "new" sociologists and historians, who exhibit the most radical manifestation of this idea. The position of these communities is expressed in the individualism that sees individual material success as the only economic objective of the person, and also in economic globalization, which supports the opening of the Israeli economic system to the world economic system, in contrast with conserving a closed and planned national economy.
Cultural characteristics These years are characterized by the challenging of the existence of a cultural hegemony in Israel. Different groups undermined the perception of the melting pot, according to which only one Israeli culture existed and all the cultures joining it had to shed their previous identities; different communities began fighting to keep their unique cultural identities. Examples include Mizrahi Jews, immigrants from the former USSR, Israeli Arabs and more.
Political characteristicsMainly after the Oslo Accords, a new movement started amongst a large section of left-wing Israelis who believe that the State of Israel should no longer declare itself to be a Jewish democratic state and should rather focus on its democratic aspects. This movement seeks to create social equality in Israel.

However, the groups in Israeli society going through those processes are not necessarily post-Zionist. Actually, only a minor percentage of those groups define themselves as such.
The above three fields do not necessarily overlap. Benjamin Netanyahu, for example, might have much in common with several post-Zionists in his economic beliefs, though he is more Zionist in all other aspects.

As an intellectual movement
Modern post-Zionism is closely associated with the New Historians, a school of historical revisionism examining the official history of Israel and Zionism in the light of declassified government documents, aiming to uncover events hitherto downplayed or suppressed by Zionist historians, especially those pertaining to the dispossession of the Palestinians, which the New Historians argue was central to the creation of the State of Israel.

The new post-Zionists are intellectuals, mainly academic people who consider themselves, or are considered by others, as post-Zionists. Critics of post-Zionism known as neo-Zionists argue that it undermines the Zionist narrative in its competition with other narratives, mainly the Palestinian one.

Although there are several intellectuals considering themselves to be post-Zionists, many others are not willing to adopt this epithet. The designation of post-Zionist has been used in a derogatory manner to describe those whose opinions take them outside the Zionist movement. Therefore, there are few intellectuals who are willing to refer to themselves as such.

In the early 1990s there began to appear articles by Israeli academicians who referred to themselves as post-Zionists; this was mostly in the aftermath of a lengthy public discussion on the issues surrounding the events of the War of Independence, attributed to the New Historians. The public mood in the aftermath of the Oslo Accords, which presumed that the Arab–Israeli conflict was nearing a conclusion, contributed even more to the development of this tendency. Since the start of the Second Intifada, public mood has changed tremendously, and as many perceive, the post-Zionist tendency has been in retreat.

On the other hand, post-Zionist historians were accused of adopting the Palestinian narrative without any doubts and of demonizing and delegitimizing Israel and Zionism.

In contrast to political Zionism's goal of the Jewish state, many post-Zionists advocate the evolution of Israel into a non-ideological, secular, liberal democratic state, to be officially neither Jewish nor Arab in character.

Criticism
Post-Zionism has been criticized by Shlomo Avineri as a polite recasting of anti-Zionism, and therefore a deceptive term. Some right-wing Israelis have accused Jewish post-Zionists of being self-hating Jews.

See also
 :Category:Post-Zionists
 Anti-Zionism
 Critical theory
 Deconstruction
 Historical revisionism
 Neo-Zionism
 Postnationalism

References

External links
The Idea of Post-Zionism and its critique by Avishai Ehrich.
Resources and articles on Post-Zionism from the World Zionist Organization, tends to be critical.
Grappling with Post-Zionism by Paul J. White
PLO Financed Academic Fraud at the University of Haifa, Dr. Aaron Lerner IMRA September 1, 2002
Post-Zionism only rings once by Neri Livneh from Haaretz
The Love of Israel: After Post-Zionism, Eretz Acheret Magazine

 
Zionism
Political theories